The Nepal women's national under-16 basketball team is the national basketball team of Nepal for Junior Women, governed by the Nepal Basketball Association (NeBA). It represents the country in international under-16 women's basketball competitions.

The team participated for the first time during the 2017 FIBA Under-16 Women's Asian Championship in Bangalore, India, wherein they finished sixth in Division B.

Current roster
Nepal roster at the 5th FIBA Under-16 Women's Asian Championship:

References

Women's national under-16 basketball teams
Basketball
2000 establishments in Nepal
Basketball teams in Nepal
Basketball teams established in 2000